as-Sawahira ash Sharqiya or Al-Sawahreh al-Sharqiyeh is a Palestinian town in the Jerusalem Governorate, located 6 kilometers south-east of East Jerusalem in the West Bank. According to the Palestinian Central Bureau of Statistics (PCBS), as-Sawahira ash Sharqiya had a population of approximately 5,210 inhabitants in mid-year 2006. as-Sawahira ash Sharqiya shares the facilities, particularly schools and health amenities of the villages of Jabal Mukaber and ash-Sheikh Sa'd. The healthcare facilities for as-Sawahira ash Sharqiya are designated as Ministry of Health level 2.

History
In 1961, under Jordanian rule, the population was 279.

1967–today
Since the Six-Day War in 1967, As-Sawahira ash-Sharqiya has been under Israeli occupation.

After the 1995 accords, 0.5% (or 335 dunums) of As-Sawahira ash-Sharqiya  land was classified as Area A; 7.2% (or 5,005 dunums) as Area B; while the remaining 92.3% (or 63,902 dunums) was classified as Area C.

Israel has confiscated land from As-Sawahira ash-Sharqiya in order to construct two Israeli settlements:
955 dunams for Kalya,
45 dunams for Kedar.

References

Bibliography

External links
 Welcome to al-Sawahira al-Sharqiyya
Survey of Western Palestine, Map 17:    IAA, Wikimedia commons
Al-Sawahreh Al - Sharqiyyeh town (fact sheet), Applied Research Institute–Jerusalem ARIJ
As Sawahira ash Sharqiya town profile, ARIJ
Al-Sawahreh Al - Sharqiyyeh (aerial photo), ARIJ
Locality Development Priorities and Needs in As Sawahira ash Sharqiya, ARIJ

Villages in the West Bank
Jerusalem Governorate
Municipalities of the State of Palestine